ACG is a multinational pharmaceutical company with its headquarters in Mumbai, India. The company has presence in over 100 countries on six continents. ACG is the world’s largest integrated supplier of solid dosage products and services. ACG provides empty hard pharmaceutical capsules, encapsulation machinery, tablet coating systems, tablet compression systems, fluid bed equipment, tablet tooling, and performance enhancers along with online and inline analytical and inspection systems. The company also provides blister packing, high barrier packaging films, carton packing machines, camera inspection systems, candy-wrapping machines, and end-of-line case packers. ACG has about 4,500 employees.

ACG business units
The ACG Group consists of four business units: ACG Capsules, ACG Films & Foils, ACG Engineering, and ACG Inspection.

ACG Capsules
ACG Capsules is a manufacturing company in the global capsules market providing two-piece hard gelatin capsules to pharmaceutical and nutraceutical industries in over 100 countries. The company has advanced capsule manufacturing facilities in India, Europe, and Brazil. 

In 2018, ACG group signed a MoU with Applied DNA Sciences to develop molecularly tagged empty hard-shell capsules for prevention of capsule counterfeiting.

ACG Films & Foils 
The ACG Films & Foils business provides specialty packaging films, high-barrier films, pharmaceutical-grade and camera-inspected range of aluminium-based foils and anti-counterfeiting and polymer films. The products of ACG Films & Foils comply with international standards such as US FDA, Canada-DMF, ISO and European Pharmacopoeia.

ACG Engineering
ACG Engineering provides capsule filling machines, tablet press, coating equipment, tablet tooling, blister & cartoning machines, and end-of-line machines. ACG has completed more than 20,000 machine installations.

ACG Inspection
ACG Inspection (ACGI) provides solutions for the track-and-trace industry. In 2018, ACG Inspection partnered with Verinetics to integrate ACGI’s track-and-trace technology with TraxSecur, a software designed to detect fraud in the supply chain using serialization and blockchain systems.

History 
ACG was founded in 1961 by brothers Ajit Singh and Jasjit Singh to manufacture empty hard capsules for Indian pharmaceutical companies. Subsequently, the company expanded to other countries and diversified into related businesses in the pharmaceutical sector. These include equipment manufacturing, packaging, inspection, testing, research and development.

In 1971, SciTech Centre was incorporated in Mumbai as the R&D center of ACG. The Centre trains around 2,000 pharma professionals every year and also hosts scientific conferences.

In 2007, ACG acquired the capsule shell manufacturing plant of Lukaps in Croatia, making it the first Indian company from the pharmaceutical sector to establish a presence in Croatia. After successfully turning around the plant's operations, ACG announced further expansion plans worth 50 million Euros.

In 2014, ACG Europe was listed among the top 41 fast-growing Indian companies in UK.

In 2017, Nova Nordeplast, a Brazilian company that produces films and foils was acquired by ACG.

In 2017, ACG acquired In2trace, a Croatia-based startup with a proprietary technology in track-and-trace business. 90% of production of ACG’s plant in Croatia is exported to the USA, Russia and European countries.

References

External links 
 

Pharmaceutical companies of India
Indian companies established in 1961
Pharmaceutical companies established in 1961
Manufacturing companies based in Mumbai
1961 establishments in Maharashtra